Ammonium bituminosulfonate or ammonium bituminosulphonate (synonyms of ichthammol, CAS# brand name: Ichthyol) is a product of natural origin obtained in the first step by dry distillation of sulfur-rich oil shale (bituminous schists). By sulfonation of the resulting oil (or purified fractions thereof), and subsequent neutralization with ammonia, Ichthammol results as a viscous, water-soluble substance with a characteristic bitumen-like odor. It is used in medicine (sometimes in combination with zinc oxide) as a treatment for different skin diseases, including eczema and psoriasis (see below). Ointments containing 10% or 20% Ichthammol are most common. They are sometimes called "black ointments" or "drawing salves". Ichthammol's dermatological action was promoted by German physician Paul Gerson Unna.

Composition
From elemental analysis, the composition of Ichthammol was calculated to be C28H36S5O6(NH4)2. However, as a product of natural origin, it is a mixture of many different compounds.

Chemically, it is a sulfonated shale oil that is incompatible with acids, alkali carbonates or hydrates and alkaloidal salts. It is a thick reddish brown liquid, possessing a bituminous odor and taste. It is soluble in water and miscible with glycerin, but is nearly insoluble in strong alcohol or concentrated ether. It contains a large percentage of organically combined sulfur.

Differentiation from Chinese Materials
Materials made in China (Pinyin transcription: yushizhi and yushizhi ruangao) and offered outside China as Ichthammol or Ammonium Bituminosulfonate do not meet the requirements for this substance in the United States Pharmacopoeia (USP) or European Pharmacopoeia (Ph.Eur). Also, there is no conformity with the definition as connected to CAS# 8029-68-3. The Chinese material is derived from vegetable oils (e.g., soybean oil) instead of bituminous schists as required (Chinese definition according to ChP 10: "Ichthammol is a mixture obtained by sulfuration of vegetable oils (soybean oil, tung oil, corn oil, etc.), sulfonation, and neutralization with ammonia"). As a result, its chemical basis is totally different from the one of Ichthammol USP/Ph.Eur./CAS# 8029-68-3. The characteristic bitumen-like odor (originating from the bituminous source material) is missing with Chinese material.

Usage

Human
Bituminosulfonates are classified as local therapeutic agents with very good tolerability. Pharmacologically, ichthammol has anti-inflammatory, bactericidal, and fungicidal properties. It is used to treat a variety of skin disorders as e.g. eczema, psoriasis, Acne rosacea and acne, and it decreases microorganisms in the area surrounding a skin condition. It is commonly used in 10% or 20% concentrate ointment, applied topically. Ichthammol ointments, commonly known as black ointment or drawing salve, should not be confused with black salve, a escharotic (corrosive) paste intended to destroy skin tissue. In contrast, ichthammol does not have any corrosive properties on the skin. 

In otology, a mixture of glycerol and ichthammol (G & I) is used for the topical treatment of ear infections. It is effective against Gram-positive bacteria. The anti-inflammatory action is explained by its influence on the formation, secretion, and effect of inflammation mediators.

Ichthammol is available in pharmacies for compounding medications. Different sources of information exist for exemplary formulations (creams, shake lotions, suppositories, etc.). 

According to the "list of preferred Specials" by the British Association of Dermatologists (BAD) Ichthammol can be used in dermatology prescribing to treat acutely inflamed atopic eczema, among others. A corresponding recommendation exists for bituminosulfonates in Germany. According to “guideline atopic eczema” bituminosulfonates can be considered for treatment of atopic eczema based on general clinic experience. In the European Dermatology Forum (EDF) guidelines for treatment of atopic eczema Ichthammol is recommended as a useful addition to the basic treatment regimen, especially in mild disease or if TCS treatment is not possible from a patient’s perspective, e.g. corticophobia (steroid phobia).

Veterinary
The European Medicines Agency published a summary report on ichthyol-substances (synonym: bituminosulfonates) during the course of the European Maximum Residue Limits (MRL) procedure in veterinary medicine. The Committee for Medicinal Products for Veterinary Use (CVMP) decided that due to good tolerance and safety, there is no need to establish an MRL for ichthyol-substances. As a result, ichthyol-substances can be applied topically in all mammalian food-producing species without restriction.

See also 

 Coal tar
 Pine tar

References

External sources

Ammonium compounds
Organosulfur compounds